The Illusion is a play by Tony Kushner, adapted from Pierre Corneille's seventeenth-century comedy, L'Illusion Comique. It follows a contrite father, Pridamant, seeking news of his prodigal son from the sorcerer Alcandre. The magician conjures three episodes from the young man's life. Inexplicably, each scene finds the boy in a slightly different world where names change and allegiances shift. Pridamant watches, but only as the strange tale reaches its conclusion does he learn the ultimate truth about his son.

The Illusion has a lighter mood than Kushner's most famous play, Angels in America, but the two plays share a love of poetic dialogue and theatricality.

Character list 
 Pridamont of Avignon, a Lawyer
 The Amanuensis, servant to Alcandre/ Geronte, father of Isabelle 
 Alcandre, a Magician 
 Calisto/ Clindor/ Theogenes, son of Pridamont
 Melibea/ Isabelle/ Hippolyta, beloved/ wife of C/C/T
 Elicia/ Lyse/ Clarina, maid/ friend of M/I/H
 Pleribo/ Adraste/ Prince Florilame, rival of C/C/T 
 Matamore, a lunatic

Setting 
The play is set in the 17th century in the dark cave of the magician Alcandre, near Remulac, a small town in the south of France.

Publication

The Illusion is published by Broadway Play Publishing Inc. in the collection Plays By Tony Kushner as well as in an acting edition.

Further reading

Wolfe, Graham. "Tony Kushner’s The Illusion and Comedy’s ‘Traversal of the Fantasy’." Journal of Dramatic Theory and Criticism 26.1 (2011): 45–64.

Kushner, Tony. "Plays By Tony Kushner".

Citations 
Kushner, Tony (31 December 2003). The Illusion. Broadway Play Publishing Inc.

References

External links
Description and reviews of 2002 performance by BareBones Theatre Group

Plays by Tony Kushner
Plays based on other plays
Adaptations of works by Pierre Corneille